Brett Keaton Harker (born July 9, 1984) is an American college baseball coach and former pitcher, who is the current head baseball coach of the Limestone Saints. He played college baseball at the College of Charleston for head coach John Pawlowski from 2003 to 2005 before playing professionally from 2005 to 2011. Harker then served as head baseball coach of the Furman Paladins (2017–2020).

Amateur career
Harker attended Hillcrest High School in Simpsonville, South Carolina. He then committed to the College of Charleston, where he was a member of the Cougars baseball team. In 2004, he played collegiate summer baseball with the Yarmouth–Dennis Red Sox of the Cape Cod Baseball League.

Professional career
Harker was drafted in the 5th round of the 2005 Major League Baseball draft by the Philadelphia Phillies.

Coaching career
On July 9, 2014, Harker was named the pitching coach of the Furman Paladins baseball team.

On July 6, 2016, Harker was introduced as the head coach of Furman. Furman University announced on May 18, 2020 that the Paladins baseball team would be terminated due to budget concerns during the COVID-19 pandemic.

In February 2021, Harker was named the pitching coach at his alma mater Hillcrest high school. The team won the Region 1 AAAAA championship, District 1 AAAAA championship, AAAAA upper-state championship, and AAAAA state-championship. This was the first state championship in school history.

Harker was named the head baseball coach at Limestone University August 3, 2021.

Head coaching record

References

External links

Furman Paladins bio

Living people
1984 births
Baseball pitchers
College of Charleston Cougars baseball players
Yarmouth–Dennis Red Sox players
Batavia Muckdogs players
Lakewood BlueClaws players
Clearwater Threshers players
Reading Phillies players
Jupiter Hammerheads players
New Orleans Zephyrs players
Schaumburg Flyers players
Lincoln Saltdogs players
High school baseball coaches in the United States
Newberry Wolves baseball coaches
Furman Paladins baseball coaches
Limestone Saints baseball coaches